Gianluca Barba (born 27 February 1995) is an Italian footballer who plays as a midfielder for  club Arzignano.

Career
Born in Fiorenzuola, Barba began his career on hometown's Atalanta's youth categories, and was promoted to main squad for 2013–14 season, receiving the no. 92 jersey.

On 4 December 2013 Barba made his professional debut, starting in a 2-0 home win over Sassuolo, for the campaign's Coppa Italia.

On 27 June 2015 Barba was signed by Serie B club Pescara, with Denis Di Rocco moved to opposite direction. Both players were tagged for €1.5 million, making a paper profit of about €1.5 million on both side. Barba returned to Pro Piacenza on loan in July 2015.

On 14 July 2016 Barba was signed by city rival Piacenza Calcio 1919.

In June 2018, he was signed by Serie C club Monza after spending two seasons with Pro Piacenza. On 24 January 2019, he joined Giana Erminio on loan. On 1 July 2019, he joined Pontedera on loan.

On 1 September 2020, Barba permanently joined Pontedera on a free contract.

On 8 July 2022, he signed with Arzignano.

References

External links
 

1995 births
Living people
People from Fiorenzuola d'Arda
Sportspeople from the Province of Piacenza
Footballers from Emilia-Romagna
Italian footballers
Association football defenders
Association football wingers
Serie C players
Atalanta B.C. players
A.S. Pro Piacenza 1919 players
Delfino Pescara 1936 players
Piacenza Calcio 1919 players
A.C. Monza players
A.S. Giana Erminio players
U.S. Città di Pontedera players
F.C. Arzignano Valchiampo players